The Glass Mountain (Swedish: Glasberget) is a 1953 Swedish drama film directed by Gustaf Molander and starring Hasse Ekman, Eva Henning and Gunn Wållgren. It was shot at the Råsunda Studios in Stockholm. The film's sets were designed by the art director P.A. Lundgren.

Cast
 Hasse Ekman as Stellan Sylvester
 Eva Henning as Marta von Born
 Gunn Wållgren as Otti Moreus
 Margit Carlqvist as Iris
 Isa Quensel as 	Luiza Cabral
 Gunnar Björnstrand as 	Dr. Dalander
 Aurore Palmgren as Cemetery Worker
 Hugo Björne as Johannes 
 Astrid Bodin as Telegraphist
 Helga Brofeldt as Marta's landlady 
 Sven-Axel Carlsson as Messenger 
 John Ivar Deckner as Professional dancer 
 Elsa Ebbesen as Ida, nurse 
 Paul Lakovary as Foreign glass customer 
 Sten Lindén as Driver 
 Lennart Lundh as Foreign department clerk
 Ulla Nyrén as Professional dancer 
 Prico Paschetto as 	Foreign glass customer 
 Gunvor Pontén as	Miss Berg, Sylvester's secretary 
 Hanny Schedin as Kristin, Sylvester's housemaid 
 Greta Stave as Nurse 
 Carl-Gunnar Wingård as Lodger

References

Bibliography 
 Qvist, Per Olov & Von Bagh, Peter . Guide to the Cinema of Sweden and Finland. Greenwood Publishing Group, 2000.
 Wallengren, Ann-Kristin.  Welcome Home Mr Swanson: Swedish Emigrants and Swedishness on Film. Nordic Academic Press, 2014.

External links 
 

1953 films
Swedish drama films
1953 drama films
1950s Swedish-language films
Films directed by Gustaf Molander
Swedish black-and-white films
1950s Swedish films